Region 3 is the name of a Statistics Canada census division, one of six in the Northwest Territories, Canada. It was introduced in the 2011 census, along with Regions 1, 2, 4, 5, and 6, resulting in the abolition of the former census divisions of Fort Smith Region and Inuvik Region (the latter not to be confused with the modern-day administrative region of the same name). Unlike in some other provinces, census divisions do not reflect the organization of local government in the Northwest Territories. These areas exist solely for the purposes of statistical analysis and presentation; they have no government of their own.

It is located within the North Slave Region administrative region and is entirely surrounded by Region 6. The region has the same communities as the Monfwi electoral district. 

Main languages in the Region include Tlicho (57.4%) and English (41.0%)

Demographics 

Communities

Community governments
Behchoko
Gamèti
Whatì
Wekweeti

References

North Slave Region
Census divisions of the Canadian territories